The Battle of Cannae was a battle that took place in 1018 between the Byzantines under the Catepan of Italy Basil Boioannes and the Lombards under Melus of Bari. The Lombards had also hired some Norman cavalry mercenaries under their leader Gilbert Buatère, while Boioannes had a detachment of elite Varangian Guard sent to him at his request to combat the Normans.

The battle was disastrous for the Lombards, who were routed.  Melus of Bari managed to escape to the Papal States and eventually to the court of Holy Roman Emperor Henry II at Bamberg. The Normans lost their leader, Gilbert Buatère, and most of their group. However, what remained of this group of Normans was the first of many to go to southern Italy. 

Within a year, a Norman garrison would be stationed at Troia in the pay of the Byzantine Empire.

See also
Italy Runestones

References

Further reading
Norwich, John Julius. The Normans in the South 1016–1130.

Cannae
Cannae
Cannae
Barletta
1010s in the Byzantine Empire
1018 in Europe
11th century in Italy
Cannae 1018
Catepanate of Italy
Medieval Apulia